Zadarski list is a Croatian daily newspaper. It is the first daily newspaper published in Zadar.

Zadarski list started on 3 November 1994 as a weekly. At that time, it was focused on the news from Zadar and the Zadar County, reaching a circulation of 12,000. Zadarski list became a daily newspaper on 21 December 1998, and switched to wider coverage of events in Croatia and the world.

References

External links
 

Croatian-language newspapers
Daily newspapers published in Croatia
Publications established in 1994
Mass media in Zadar
1994 establishments in Croatia